Asbury Methodist Episcopal Church, known now as Asbury United Methodist Church, is a historic church located at Allen, Wicomico County, Maryland. It is a rectangular, gable-front frame structure, with the entrance located in a square bell tower centered on the front. The main block of the building was constructed in 1848 and the tower was added in 1883.

It was listed on the National Register of Historic Places in 1999.

References

External links

, including undated photo, at Maryland Historical Trust

Allen, Maryland
Churches on the National Register of Historic Places in Maryland
Churches completed in 1848
Victorian architecture in Maryland
19th-century Methodist church buildings in the United States
United Methodist churches in Maryland
Churches in Wicomico County, Maryland
National Register of Historic Places in Wicomico County, Maryland